E3 ubiquitin-protein ligase RLIM is an enzyme that in humans is encoded by the RLIM gene.

Function 

The protein encoded by this gene is a RING-H2 zinc finger protein. It has been shown to be a ubiquitin protein ligase that targets LIM domain binding 1 (LDB1/CLIM), and causes proteasome-dependent degradation of LDB1. This protein and LDB1 are co-repressors of LHX1/LIM-1, a homeodomain transcription factor. Alternatively spliced transcript variants encoding the same protein have been reported. Functions in female mice as a regulator of X chromosome inactivation .

Interactions 

RNF12 has been shown to interact with Estrogen receptor alpha.

References

Further reading 

 
 
 
 
 
 
 

RING finger proteins